Morgan De Sanctis (born 26 March 1977) is an Italian former professional footballer who played as a goalkeeper. He last played for Ligue 1 club Monaco, and currently works as sporting director for Salernitana.

De Sanctis played for several Italian clubs throughout his career; he began his career with Pescara, and later also played for Juventus, Udinese, Napoli, and Roma; he also had spells in Spain and Turkey with Sevilla and Galatasaray respectively, and ended his career in France after a season with Monaco in 2017.

At international level, he has represented the Italy national team, and was included in squads for the 2000 Summer Olympics, UEFA Euro 2008, the 2009 FIFA Confederations Cup, the 2010 FIFA World Cup and UEFA Euro 2012.

Club career

Early career
After a three-year stint with Serie B side Pescara, De Sanctis became a reserve player for the Serie A giants Juventus, playing only three times in two seasons before joining Udinese in 1999 in a co-ownership deal along with Marco Zamboni, for 2.5 billion Lire (€1,291,142.25) each. In May 2000, the deal became permanent, for 8 billion lire (€4,131,655), as part of the deal that Juventus signed Marco Zanchi.

Udinese
After three seasons also as a back-up for Luigi Turci, he finally managed to start in 2002–03 season. His contract was renewed on 10 November 2000, 18 October 2003 and 20 September 2005, which his annual gross salary increased from €569,000 (€310,000 net) in 2003 to €623,000 (€350,000 net) in 2005, plus other bonuses, including a loyalty bonus since 2005, for €350,878 a season (€200,000 net). He played all 6 group stage matches of the 2005–06 UEFA Champions League, and reached round of 16 of the 2005–06 UEFA Cup.

Sevilla
On 8 June 2007, he unilaterally terminated his contract with Udinese, by mis-using Webster ruling. He signed a four-year contract with Sevilla FC, worth €1,381,578.94 a season (€1.05 million in net). Udinese submitted the case to FIFA Dispute Resolution Chamber as Udinese and De Sanctis failed to agree the compensation. On 10 December 2009, the DRC awarded Udinese liable to receive €3,933,134 from De Sanctis, quoting Matuzalém's case as legal reference. The case then appealed to the Court of Arbitration for Sport and on 1 March 2011 awarded Udinese a sum of €2,250,055.

Galatasaray (loan)
He was loaned out to Galatasaray for the 2008–09 season.
He played all the league and European matches since 31 August.

Napoli
On 24 July 2009, Napoli signed the goalkeeper from Sevilla FC on a four-year deal, for €1.5 million.

Roma
On 25 July 2013, Roma signed De Sanctis on a two-year deal from Napoli, for a transfer fee of €500,000. He had aided to Roma's perfect start to the Serie A season, keeping 9 clean sheets in the first 10 games, conceding just once as they topped the table on 30 points. On 5 January 2014, in a crucial match against Juventus, he conceded three goals for the first time of the season meaning that Roma were now 8 points behind Juventus at the top of the table. During the 2013–14 season, he went 745 consecutive minutes without conceding a goal in the Italian top-flight; he currently holds the joint seventh-highest unbeaten streak in Serie A, alongside Luca Marchegiani.

Monaco
On 13 July 2016, De Sanctis was signed by Monaco on a one-year deal.

He made his debut for the club on 26 July, in the first leg of the Third qualifying round of the UEFA Champions League against Fenerbahçe, but was forced off in the 12th minute of the eventual 2–1 away defeat after sustaining an injury. He served as the club's second goalkeeper throughout the season, making his only Ligue 1 appearance on 10 September, in a 4–1 away win over Lille. On 6 December, he featured in Monaco's 3–0 defeat to Bayer Leverkusen in the Champions League, becoming the first Italian player to play in the competition with five different clubs (Udinese, Sevilla, Napoli, Roma, and Monaco). Monaco went on to reach the semi-finals of the tournament, losing out to De Sanctis's former club Juventus. On 26 April 2017, he started in the club's 5–0 defeat to eventual champions Paris Saint-Germain in the Coupe de France semi-final.

Monaco finished the 2016–17 season as Ligue 1 champions. After De Sanctis's contract expired with the club on 31 July 2017, he announced his retirement from professional football.

International career
At youth level, De Sanctis represented the Italy under-21 side on 7 occasions between 1999 and 2000, and won the 2000 UEFA European Under-21 Championship with the team. He was also part of the Italy squad that took part at the 2000 Summer Olympics in Sydney.

De Sanctis never became a regular in the Italian senior national team due to the consistency of Gianluigi Buffon, and therefore often served as a back-up keeper. De Sanctis made his senior international debut for Italy on 30 March 2005, under manager Marcello Lippi, in a 0–0 friendly draw against Iceland. Although he did not make Lippi's 23-man squad for the 2006 FIFA World Cup, he was chosen as one of the four back-up players to be called up in the event of an injury to Buffon, Angelo Peruzzi or Marco Amelia. After the 2006 FIFA World Cup, he secured a place as the team's number two goalkeeper to travel with the Italian squad to UEFA Euro 2008, under Roberto Donadoni, as well as the 2009 FIFA Confederations Cup and the 2010 FIFA World Cup, under Lippi. Although Buffon suffered an injury in the opening match of the latter tournament, De Sanctis did not feature in any matches, as Federico Marchetti was instead chosen to start; Italy were eliminated in the first round.

The team's subsequent coach Cesare Prandelli preferred to include younger understudies, such as Antonio Mirante and Salvatore Sirigu, to Buffon, instead of De Sanctis. However, after injury to Emiliano Viviano, De Sanctis returned to the squad as Buffon's back-up for UEFA Euro 2012 qualifying matches in September 2011, and also appeared in Italy's 3–0 friendly win against Northern Ireland in Pescara on 11 October, three years after his last cap for Italy. He eventually made the squad for the final tournament, but did not play, as Italy reached the final. His final match for Italy came on 16 October 2012, in a 3–1 win over Denmark in a 2014 World Cup qualifier. On 26 March 2013, the day of his 36th birthday, he announced that he would be retiring from international football after Italy's World Cup qualifier against Malta later that day. In total, he made 6 appearances for Italy.

Style of play
A reliable and commanding goalkeeper, known for his leadership from the back and vocal presence on the pitch, in his prime, De Sanctis was known in particular for his shot-stopping ability, positioning, handling, and speed when rushing off his line, and is regarded as one of the best Italian goalkeepers of his generation; he was also adept at stopping penalties.

After football
Following his retirement as a player, De Sanctis was appointed a team manager with his former club Roma in August 2017.

In the autumn of 2017, he enrolled in an UEFA's coaching programme, which allowed him to coach youth teams, and first teams in Serie C, as well as hold assistant manager positions in Serie B and Serie A. On 15 December, he received his coaching licence.

In December 2018, he also obtained his Sporting Director diploma through the Coverciano Technical Centre.

Car crash
On January 5, 2021, De Sanctis was involved in a car accident in Rome, which caused serious injuries to him. He was rushed to hospital and had undergone an operation on an abdominal haemorrhage, where his spleen was removed.

Career statistics

Club
Source:

1Includes Supercoppa Italiana.

International
Source:

Honours

Club
Juventus
 Serie A: 1997–98
 Supercoppa Italiana: 1997UdineseUEFA Intertoto Cup: 2000 Galatasaray Turkish Super Cup: 2008Napoli Coppa Italia: 2011–12Monaco Ligue 1: 2016–17

InternationalItaly'''
UEFA European Championship: Runner-up  2012

Individual
Pallone d'Argento: 2009–10

References

External links

 Player profile on Napoli's official website
 AIC Player profile 
 Ligue 1 Player profile
 FIGC Player profile  

Living people
1977 births
Sportspeople from the Province of Chieti
Association football goalkeepers
Italian footballers
Italy youth international footballers
Italy under-21 international footballers
Italy international footballers
Delfino Pescara 1936 players
Juventus F.C. players
Udinese Calcio players
Sevilla FC players
Galatasaray S.K. footballers
S.S.C. Napoli players
A.S. Roma players
AS Monaco FC players
Serie A players
Serie B players
La Liga players
Süper Lig players
Ligue 1 players
Olympic footballers of Italy
Footballers at the 2000 Summer Olympics
UEFA Euro 2008 players
2009 FIFA Confederations Cup players
2010 FIFA World Cup players
UEFA Euro 2012 players
Italian expatriate footballers
Expatriate footballers in Spain
Expatriate footballers in Turkey
Expatriate footballers in Monaco
Italian expatriate sportspeople in Spain
Italian expatriate sportspeople in Turkey
Italian expatriate sportspeople in Monaco
A.S. Roma non-playing staff
Footballers from Abruzzo